Maroof is a name. It is derived from the Arabic word "ma'ruf" or "miftahul ma'ruf", an Islamic term meaning that which is commonly known or acknowledged. Notable people with the name include:

Places
Maroof, Gujrat

Given name
Bismah Maroof (born 18 July 1991), Pakistani international cricketer
Rabun Maroof (born 1 July 1976), Iraqi Kurdish politician

Middle name
Abdul Maroof Gullestani (born 8 June 1986), Afghan football player